Britain's Road to Socialism is the programme of the Communist Party of Britain, and is adhered to by the Young Communist League and the editors of the Morning Star newspaper.

It proposes that socialism can be achieved in Britain by the working class leading various political forces in a popular democratic alliance against monopoly capital, and implementing a left-wing programme of socialist construction. Part of this strategy involves winning the labour movement with a left-wing position, through struggle in the existing democratic bodies of the working class, such as trades unions, trades union councils and tenant's associations.

History
The publication of Communist Party programmes in Britain began in the 1920s with the release of Class against Class, the General Election Programme of the Communist Party of Great Britain. This was published in 1929 by the Communist Party of Great Britain (CPGB), the precursor to the Communist Party of Britain, for the general election of that year in which the party fielded 25 candidates. The subsequent programme, titled For Soviet Britain, was published for the party's 13th Congress in 1935. An unnamed draft programme was issued in 1939 but the Second World War and its aftermath delayed the publication of an updated programme until the 1950s.

For Soviet Britain was finally superseded in February 1951 when The British Road to Socialism was published, the original incarnation of today's Britain's Road to Socialism. The first edition of the document received the personal approval of Joseph Stalin prior to publication. The British Road built on themes already present in the Communist Party's 1949 election programme The Socialist Road for Britain, and Stalin's commentary did not suggest significant diversion from the existing policy. Under its original name, it underwent revisions in 1952, 1958, 1968 and 1977.

When the CPGB's leadership abandoned The British Road to Socialism in 1985, elements in the party that remained loyal to the programme, including the then editorial board of The Morning Star, split to form the Communist Party of Britain in 1988. The re-established party published the 6th edition of the programme in 1989, with a revision in 1992 to take into account the onset of capitalist restoration in Eastern Europe. Three subsequent editions have been produced with further revisions and a change of title to Britain's Road to Socialism. The 7th edition was published in 2001, the 8th in 2011, and the 9th in 2020.

References

External links

9th edition (2020)

1951 in British politics
1951 in the United Kingdom
1951 documents
Communism in the United Kingdom
Communist Party of Britain
Communist Party of Great Britain
Party platforms